Maurice Trueheart Peatros (May 22, 1927 – June 25, 2017) was an American Negro league first baseman.

A native of Pittsburgh, Pennsylvania, Peatros attended Westinghouse High School. In 1947, he played for the Homestead Grays, and went on to play minor league baseball into the 1950s with such clubs as the Geneva Robins, Erie Sailors, and Magic Valley Cowboys. Peatros died in San Jacinto, California in 2017 at age 90.

References

External links
 and Seamheads

1927 births
2017 deaths
Homestead Grays players
Baseball first basemen
Baseball players from Pittsburgh
20th-century African-American sportspeople
Farnham Pirates players
Geneva Robins players
Fargo-Moorhead Twins players
Erie Sailors players
Magic Valley Cowboys players
Drummondville Royals players